Triphyllus is a genus of beetles belonging to the family Mycetophagidae.

Species:
 Triphyllus bicolor

References

Tenebrionoidea
Tenebrionoidea genera